The William Collins House is a historic house in Fall River, Massachusetts. It was built in 1800 and added to the National Register of Historic Places in 1983.

The house is a small -story vernacular farmhouse with the typical five-bay, center chimney plan. It has window trim elements that are probably a mid-19th century Italianate addition. It is one of six houses in the Steep Brook area considered to be the best representatives of the pre-industrial era of the city's history, amplified by the house's setting on a large and semi-rural lot.

See also
National Register of Historic Places listings in Fall River, Massachusetts

References

Houses in Fall River, Massachusetts
National Register of Historic Places in Fall River, Massachusetts
Houses on the National Register of Historic Places in Bristol County, Massachusetts
Houses completed in 1800